OR Tambo Cosmos is a South African football (soccer) club from Mthatha (OR Tambo District Municipality, Eastern Cape) that participates in the Vodacom League.

External links
Premier Soccer League Official Website
National First Division section @ psl.co.za

SAFA Second Division clubs
Soccer clubs in the Eastern Cape
1997 establishments in South Africa
King Sabata Dalindyebo Local Municipality